Admiral Sir Alexander Ludovic Duff  (20 February 1862 – 22 November 1933) was a Royal Navy officer who served as Commander-in-Chief, China Station.

Naval career

Duff joined the Royal Navy as a Midshipman in 1875. He was promoted Commander in 1897, and served in command of the destroyer HMS Bat in home waters from January 1898 to January 1900. In March that year, he was posted to the HMS Excellent for senior officers' gunnery course at the gunnery school based there. He was promoted to captain on 31 December 1902, and to rear-admiral in 1913. In 1905 he was appointed Naval Assistant to the Controller of the Navy.  In 1909, he was given command of HMS Temeraire.  He was Director of the Mobilisation Division at the Admiralty from 1912 through the start of the war. He served in World War I as Rear-Admiral (Second-in-Command) of the 4th Battle Squadron from 1914 to 1916, taking part in the Battle of Jutland in 1916, where he flew his flag in HMS Superb. He was transferred to the Fourth Battle Squadron after Jutland.

He then became Director of the new Anti-Submarine Division at the end of 1916. Like the First Sea Lord, Admiral Jellicoe, Duff initially opposed the use of convoys. However, his efforts greatly reduced the destruction caused by the "underwater menace". In 1917 he became Assistant Chief of Naval Staff and then, from 1919, Commander-in-Chief, China Station. He retired in 1925.

Family
In 1886, he married his first cousin Janet Douglas Duff; they had two daughters. In 1924 he married Alice Marjorie Hill-Whitson; they had no children.

References

External links

Books
 Grigg, John. Lloyd George: War Leader, 1916–1918 Allen Lane, London 2002 

1862 births
1933 deaths
Military personnel from Aberdeenshire
Royal Navy admirals
Royal Navy admirals of World War I
Knights Grand Cross of the Order of the Bath
Knights Grand Cross of the Order of the British Empire
Knights Commander of the Royal Victorian Order
Commandeurs of the Légion d'honneur
Foreign recipients of the Distinguished Service Medal (United States)
Lords of the Admiralty
British expatriates in China
Recipients of the Navy Distinguished Service Medal